is a Japanese late night variety show starring Japanese idol group Hiragana Keyakizaka46. It was hosted by the comedy duo Audrey and aired every Monday at 1:05 AM JST on TV Tokyo. After the group was rebranded to Hinatazaka46, the show was succeeded by Hinatazaka de Aimashō.

History
As a subgroup of Keyakizaka46, Hiragana Keyakizaka46 members initially appeared on Keyakitte, Kakenai? with the main group members. In March 2018, a new show for the subgroup was announced. After episode 5, a song performance was included at the end of the show.

The last episode aired on April 1, 2019, as Hiragana Keyakizaka46 changed their name to Hinatazaka46. The show was succeeded by Hinatazaka de Aimashō, which is identical except for the name.

In March 2021, the first set of Hiragana Oshi DVD and Blu-ray was released, consisting of five editions. Instead of including episodes in chronological order, each edition was named after a first generation Hinatazaka46 member and included episodes which featured notable scenes, including deleted scenes, of that member; the same member would also lead the discussion segment in each edition. The second set of five editions, named after second generation Hinatazaka46 members and Hinano Kamimura (the only third generation member who appeared in the show), was released in January 2022.

Production 
The Hiragana Keyakizaka46 management intended to create a program with the same atmosphere as Nogizakatte, Doko? (predecessor to Nogizaka Kōjichū) for the group, and producer Makoto Nagao, who has also been the producer of Nogizaka46 and Keyakizaka46's variety shows, aimed for the shows to become a "catalog" for the group and lead to various outside jobs. The reason for using Audrey as MC was to create a similar relationship between the hosts and the members as in Nogizaka Kōjichū and Keyakitte, Kakenai?, so that it would look good if a joint special episode was to be produced. They also had the reputation of not being good at working with young girls, partly because they had attended a boys' school during their youth, which was thought to be able to form an interesting dynamic, and many staff members had wanted to work with them. Despite their busy schedules, they agreed almost immediately.

The production staff appreciated that many of the members were "cheerful and positive", and wrote detailed answers in the production questionnaires and asked questions after the recording. In the early days of the show, the Audrey duo did come across as being shy around a large group of girls, but Wakabayashi managed to bring out the members' individual characteristics and the "groove" of the show steadily grew.

Nagao noted that Audrey and the production staff were comparable to boys' school students, while the Hiragana Keyakizaka46 members were like neighboring girls' school students who would organize joint events with them, creating a relationship that worked well. Director Katsutoshi Shirano commented that after the two-part episode titled "Let's Get Closer to Audrey!", the members and Audrey actually became closer and the members became easier to work with.

Reception 
Pop culture writer Hiko noted that the production staff's love for Audrey was "extraordinary", and that Hiragana Oshi could be seen as a "redo" of Audrey's youth at a boys' school. He agreed that the members' excitement and "overflowing girls' school spirit" successfully created an atmosphere of "encounter between an all-boys school and an all-girls school", which became the core of Hiragana Oshi.

Hiko particularly noted episode 43, in which Audrey introduced the shōnen manga Kinnikuman to the members, as the "pinnacle of boys' school enthusiasm". It was mentioned on Twitter by Takashi Shimada, one of the two Kinnikuman authors who share the pen name Yudetamago, and was featured on the obi for the 66th volume of the manga released on March 7, 2019. Konoka Matsuda, who was selected as the episode's MVP, was interviewed in the May 20, 2019 issue of Weekly Playboy as "an idol who knows too much about Kinnikuman".

Real Sound commented that Hiragana Keyakizaka46's variety skills "blossomed" in the show and that the group's encounter with the Audrey duo was, in member Shiho Katō's words, "the work of fate".

Home media

First set (March 2021)

Second set (January 2022)

References

External links 
  - TV Tokyo 
  

Hinatazaka46
2018 Japanese television series debuts
2019 Japanese television series endings
TV Tokyo original programming
Japanese variety television shows